The Abita Mystery House is a roadside attraction and self-guided folk art showcase located in the heart of Abita Springs, Louisiana, United States. It was created and is maintained by artist/inventor John Preble, whose inspiration came from the Tinkertown Museum in New Mexico, it offers thousands of folk art objects ranging from encased interactive miniatures, to pottery, to Louisiana-themed sculptures like Darrel the Dogigator (half alligator, half dog) and Edmond the Allisapien (half alligator, half homo sapiens). Originally called the UCM Museum till its official name change in 2007, the house entrance is a vintage gas station, with filling pumps and bright decor, which leads to open air sections, the main exhibition hall, a ninety-year-old Creole cottage, and the House of Shards, among other attractions. The Mystery House is unique in that it bears a particularly odd aesthetic, drawing alternative crowds with an eye for the strange. John Bullard, director of the New Orleans Museum of Art, has even gone as far as saying that the Abita Mystery House is the "most intriguing and provocative museum in Louisiana."

In the press

The Abita Mystery House has been featured in books and on television. The popular History Channel show American Pickers paid Preble and his creations a visit for their August 12, 2013 episode titled "Louisiana Purchase."

References

External links

The Town of Abita Springs

Museums in St. Tammany Parish, Louisiana
Roadside attractions in Louisiana
Folk art museums and galleries in Louisiana
2007 establishments in Louisiana
Museums established in 2007